Albert Hofman is a Dutch clinical epidemiologist. He is currently the Stephen B. Kay Family Professor of Public Health and the chair of the Department of Epidemiology at the Harvard T.H. Chan School of Public Health.

Early life and education 
Hofman was born in 1951 in Hardenberg, the Netherlands.  He attended medical school at the University of Groningen and graduated in 1976 with his MD. He went on to complete a second research fellowship within the department of epidemiology at the Harvard School of Public Health in Boston, Massachusetts, in 1982. He then completed his PhD at the Erasmus University of Rotterdam in 1983.

His research fellowship was completed within the department of community medicine at the University of Groningen, 1975; and his clinical residencies were completed in the departments of internal medicine at the Academic Hospitals Groningen and Leiden in 1977.

Career 

In 1981 he became an assistant professor at Erasmus University Medical School, Rotterdam; he was promoted to associate professor in 1984, and to full professor in 1988.  In 1988 he became chairman of the department of epidemiology, Erasmus Medical Center, Rotterdam, Netherlands, in which he served until 2016.  He also served as the science director of the graduate school of the Netherlands Institute for Health Sciences (NIHES) since its inception in 1992 to 2015. Hofman has served as the editor-in-chief of the European Journal of Epidemiology since 2000.

Hofman is the initiator and principal investigator of two population-based, prospective cohort studies in the city of Rotterdam, the Netherlands: the Rotterdam Study and the Generation R study. Data collection for these studies started in 1990 and 2002, respectively. These cohort studies both target multiple common diseases, have very extensive and state-of-the-art assessments of the putative determinants of these diseases, and employ many new technologies not previously applied to epidemiologic population studies.

The study of multiple outcomes, in particular of neurological, cardiovascular and endocrine diseases, has enabled the investigation of the interrelations of diseases, and thereby of the co-morbidity and co-etiology of various diseases with a large population burden. This has made the findings in these studies generally useful for public health purposes, as well as for clinical medicine.

These studies included the first use of genome-wide assessment and large-scale imaging of whole cohorts in epidemiological studies. The Rotterdam Study was one of the five founding cohorts of the very productive CHARGE consortium which has performed many successful genome-wide association studies that have found a large number of genes associated with common diseases. The Rotterdam Study has also pioneered new population imaging modalities, including magnetic resonance imaging since 1995.

In addition to contributing to over 2,000 publications during his career, he is also the faculty director of the clinical epidemiology program within the department of epidemiology at the Harvard Chan School.

Honors and distinctions
1983: Received promotion, cum laude. Dissertation: Blood pressure in childhood. Epidemiological probes into the aetiology of high blood pressure. Promoter: Prof. H.A. Valkenburg.
1992: Gave the inaugural lecture at Erasmus University: On patients, populations and the Hippocratic epidemiology.
2002: Became member of the Royal Netherlands Academy of Arts and Sciences.
2007: Was honorary promoter of Barry Bloom, Harvard University.
2012: Received the Folksam Prize in Epidemiologic Research, Karolinska Institutet, Stockholm, Sweden.
2013: Received an honorary doctorate from the University of Belgrade, Serbia.

Publications 
 Kavousi M, et al. Prevalence and Prognostic Implications of Coronary Artery Calcification in Low-Risk Women A Meta-analysis. JAMA. 2016;316(20):2126-2134.
 Adams HHH, et al. Amyloid-beta transmission or unexamined bias? Nature. 2016;537(7620):E7-E8.
 Kavousi M, et al. Comparison of application of the ACC/AHA Guidelines, Adult Treatment Panel III Guidelines, and European Society of Cardiology Guidelines for cardiovascular disease prevention in a European cohort. JAMA. 2014;311(14):1416-23.
 Van Dijk FS, et al. PLS3 mutations in X-linked osteoporosis with fractures. N Engl J Med. 2013 Oct 17;369(16):1529-36.
 Jonsson T, et al. Variant of TREM2 Associated with the Risk of Alzheimer's Disease. N Engl J Med. 2013;368:107-116.
 Rietveld CA, et al. GWAS of 126,559 individuals identifies genetic variants associated with educational attainment. Science. 2013 Jun 21;340(6139):1467-71.
 Den Ruijter HM, et al. Common carotid intima- media thickness measurements in cardiovascular risk prediction: a meta-analysis. JAMA. 2012 Aug 22;308(8):796-803.
 Schrijvers EM, Koudstaal PJ, Hofman A, Breteler MM. Plasma clusterin and the risk of Alzheimer disease. JAMA. 2011 Apr 6;305(13):1322-6.
 Solouki AM, et al. A genome-wide association study identifies a susceptibility locus for refractive errors and myopia at 15q14. Nat Genet. 2010 Oct;42(10):897-901.
 Lp PLASC, et al. J. Lipoprotein-associated phospholipase A(2) and risk of coronary disease, stroke, and mortality: collaborative analysis of 32 prospective studies. Lancet. 2010 May 1;375(9725):1536-44.
 Ikram MA, et al. Genomewide association studies of stroke. N Engl J Med. 2009 Apr 23;360(17):1718-28.
 Newton-Cheh C, et al. Common variants at ten loci influence QT interval duration in the QTGEN Study. Nat Genet. 2009 Apr;41(4):399-406.
 Dehghan A, et al. Association of three genetic loci with uric acid concentration and risk of gout: a genome-wide association study. Lancet. 2008 Dec 6;372(9654):1953-61.
 Vernooij MW, et al. Incidental findings on brain MRI in the general population. N Engl J Med. 2007 Nov 1;357(18):1821-8.
 Meurs JB van, et al. Homocysteine levels and the risk of osteoporotic fracture. N Engl J Med 2004;350:2033-41.
 Vermeer SE, Prins ND, den Heijer T, Hofman A, Koudstaal PJ, Breteler MMB. Silent brain infarcts and the risk of dementia and cognitive decline. N Engl J Med. 2003;348:1215-22.
 Veld BA in ‘t, et al. Nonsteroidal antiinflammatory drugs and the risk of Alzheimer’s disease. N Engl J Med. 2001;345:1515-21.
 Uitterlinden AG, et al. Relation of alleles of the collagen type 11 gene to bone density and the risk of osteoporotic fractures in postmenopausal women. N Engl J Med. 1998;338:1016-21.
 Hofman A, et al. Atherosclerosis, apolipoprotein and prevalence of dementia and Alzheimer’s disease. The Rotterdam Study. Lancet. 1997;349:151-4.
 Will RG, et al. A new variant of Creutzfeldt-Jakob disease in the UK. Lancet. 1996;347:921-5.
 Duijn et al. Apolipoprotein E4 allele in a population based study of early onset Alzheimer’s disease. Nat Genet. 1994;7:74-9.
 Hendriks L, et al. Presenile-dementia and cerebral- hemorrhage linked to a mutation at codon-692 of the beta-amyloid precursor protein gene. Nat Genet. 1992;1:218-21.
 Hooft IMS van,et al. Renal hemodynamics and the renin-angiotensin-aldosterone system in the early phase of primary hypertension. N Engl J Med. 1991;324:1305-11.
 Walter HJ, Hofman A, Vaughan RD, Wynder E. Modification of risk factors for coronary heart disease. Five-year results of a school-based intervention trial. N Engl J Med. 1988;318:1093-100.
 Hofman A, Hazebroek A, Valkenburg HA. A randomized trial of sodium intake and blood pressure in newborn infants. JAMA. 1983;250:370-3.

References 

1951 births
Living people
Dutch epidemiologists
Harvard University faculty
Members of the Royal Netherlands Academy of Arts and Sciences